This article is about the particular significance of the year 1828 to Wales and its people.

Incumbents
Lord Lieutenant of Anglesey – Henry Paget, 1st Marquess of Anglesey 
Lord Lieutenant of Brecknockshire – Henry Somerset, 6th Duke of Beaufort
Lord Lieutenant of Caernarvonshire – Thomas Assheton Smith (until 12 May); Peter Drummond-Burrell, 22nd Baron Willoughby de Eresby (from 25 November) 
Lord Lieutenant of Cardiganshire – William Edward Powell
Lord Lieutenant of Carmarthenshire – George Rice, 3rd Baron Dynevor 
Lord Lieutenant of Denbighshire – Sir Watkin Williams-Wynn, 5th Baronet    
Lord Lieutenant of Flintshire – Robert Grosvenor, 1st Marquess of Westminster 
Lord Lieutenant of Glamorgan – John Crichton-Stuart, 2nd Marquess of Bute 
Lord Lieutenant of Merionethshire – Sir Watkin Williams-Wynn, 5th Baronet
Lord Lieutenant of Montgomeryshire – Edward Clive, 1st Earl of Powis
Lord Lieutenant of Pembrokeshire – Sir John Owen, 1st Baronet
Lord Lieutenant of Radnorshire – George Rodney, 3rd Baron Rodney

Bishop of Bangor – Henry Majendie 
Bishop of Llandaff – Edward Copleston  
Bishop of St Asaph – John Luxmoore 
Bishop of St Davids – John Jenkinson

Events
1 June - The Saundersfoot Railway and Harbour Company is formed.
19 June - The Llanelly Dock is established by Act of Parliament.
September - Prince Augustus Frederick, Duke of Sussex, visits the eisteddfod at Denbigh, making it the first to receive a royal visit.
unknown dates
An iron suspension bridge is built to link South Stack with Holy Island, Anglesey.
David Owen (Brutus) becomes editor of the periodical Lleuad yr Oes at Aberystwyth.

Arts and literature

New books
 Ellis Evans - Unoliaeth a Gweledigaeth yr Eglwys, sef, Llythyr Cymanfa Cefn Mawr
 T. J. Llewelyn Prichard - The Adventures and Vagaries of Twm Shon Catti, descriptive of life in Wales; interspersed with poems
 David Saunders (Dafydd Glan Teifi) - Awdl ar Fordaith yr Apostol Paul
 John Thomas - Telyn y Cantorion
 John Walters - An English and Welsh Dictionary
 Thomas Wiliam - Cwyn yr Unig

Music
 William Owen (Gwilym Ddu Glan Hafren) - Y Caniedydd Crefyddol (collection of hymn tunes)

Births
30 January - John David Jenkins, philanthropist (d. 1876)
4 March - Owen Wynne Jones (Glasynys), clergyman and writer (d. 1870)
13 March - Thomas Morgan Thomas, missionary (d. 1884)
6 May - Sir Hugh Rowlands, soldier (d. 1909)
4 June - David Thomas (Dewi Hefin), poet (d. 1909)
23 September - Charles James Watkin Williams, politician (d. 1884)
30 October - Henry James, 1st Baron James of Hereford, lawyer and statesman (d. 1911)
13 December - David Lewis Wooding, genealogist (d. 1891)
 date unknown
John Richard Hughes, evangelist (d. 1893)
John Pryce, clergyman and writer (d. 1903)

Deaths
19 February - Thomas Jones (Y Bardd Cloff), 59
29 March - Griffith Rowlands, surgeon, 65
12 May - Thomas Assheton Smith I, industrialist, 75
15 September - William Madocks, landowner, 55
4 October - Sir Thomas Hanmer, 2nd Baronet, politician, 46/47
29 December - Priscilla Bertie, 21st Baroness Willoughby de Eresby, 67
 date unknown - Edward Charles (Siamas Gwynedd), writer, 70?

References

 
Wales
 Wales